The Bertus-Ducatel House, at 1721 Lakeshore Dr. in Mandeville, Louisiana, was built around 1839.  It was listed on the National Register of Historic Places in 1998.

It is French Creole in style.  It was built with brick-between-post (briquette entre poteaux) construction, which is rare in the United States outside of New Orleans.

It has also been known as Little Flower Villa.

References

External links

National Register of Historic Places in St. Tammany Parish, Louisiana

Creole architecture in the United States
Buildings and structures completed in 1839